MatPat's Game Lab is a single-season YouTube Premium reality streaming television series hosted by Matthew Patrick that debuted on June 8, 2016.

Every episode was filmed and released with an accompanying 360-degree video. These videos are either staged pieces about the same game or behind the scenes videos to the episodes. The 360-degree videos were released for free on The Game Theorists YouTube channel, whereas the main series is only fully available for those with a YouTube Premium subscription.

The show won a Streamy Award in 2016 in the now-discontinued Virtual Reality and 360-Degree Video category.

While the release of the first season proved to be a success with high approval among fans, it's assumed the overall production and staffing cost to make each video would outweigh the total profit of the show itself and would be unable to sustain a second season. On October 21, 2017, the episode "Surviving Five Nights of FEAR!" was made free to watch, renaming the episode "Can YOU Survive FNAF IRL? | Free Episode Game Lab FNAF" presumably as a last resort to gain more interest.

While Youtube has neither cancelled or renewed the series for a second season, fans assume that the overall cost, in addition to lack of profit, was what caused the series to flop.

Episodes

References

External links
 
 

2016 web series debuts
Mass media in California
Streamy Award-winning channels, series or shows
YouTube Premium original series